Gandevi is a City and a Municipality in Navsari district  in the state of Gujarat, India.

History

Gandevi has a special place in Shivaji Maharaj's 1st Surat campaign, Battle of Surat

Demographics
As of 2001 India census, Gandevi had a total population of 15,865 in 3,243 households with an even sex ratio. Gandevi has an average literacy rate of 77%, higher than the national average of 59.5%. Male literacy is around 81%, and female literacy is around 72%. 10% of the population is under 6 years of age.

References

Cities and towns in Navsari district